Chinchilla is a rural town and locality in the Western Downs Region, Queensland, Australia.

Chinchilla is known as the 'Melon Capital of Australia', and plays host to a Melon Festival every second year in February – the next is to be held in 2023.

Geography

History
Baranggum (also known as Barrunggam, Barunggam Parrungoom, Murrumgama) is an Australian Aboriginal language spoken by the Baranggum people. The Baranggum language region includes the landscape within the local government boundaries of the Western Downs Regional Council, particularly Dalby, Tara, Jandowae and west towards Chinchilla.

Mandandanji (also known as Mandandanyi, Mandandanjdji, Kogai) is an Australian Aboriginal language spoken by the Mandandanji people. The Mandandanji language region includes the landscape within the local government boundaries of the Maranoa Regional Council, particularly Roma, Yuleba and Surat, then east towards Chinchilla and south-west towards Mitchell and St George.

The town name is a corruption of the Aboriginal word "tintinchilla" or "jinchilla" indicating cypress pine, possibly recorded by explorer and naturalist Ludwig Leichhardt.

The town was established in 1877. As the railway pushed west across the Darling Downs from Toowoomba and Dalby, a temporary construction camp was established on the banks of Charley's Creek which developed into a town.

Chinchilla Post Office opened on 3 January 1878.

Chinchilla State School opened on 22 January 1883. A secondary department was opened in 1954, closing in 1963 when Chinchilla State High School opened. The school celebrated its centenary in 1983.

Mulga Provisional School opened circa 1896. On 1 January 1909, it became Mulga State School. Between 1914 and 1915, the school operated as a half-time school, sharing a single teacher with Hill Top Provisional School (later Boonarga State School). It closed in 1915 but reopened as the full-time Mulga State School in 1917. It closed circa 1943.

Riversdale Provisional School opened in 1902. On 1 January 1909, it became Riversdale State School. It closed in 1915. It was at the south-western end of Windmill Road (approx ).

Monmouth Provisional School opened on 16 August 1904. On 1 January 1909, it became Monmouth State School.It closed in April 1921, reopening as Monmouth Provisional School in 1930. It closed circa 1946. It was at 33 Hunter Road off Monmouth Bridge Road.

In 1911, the Queensland Railway Department built a tramway from Chinchilla to Wongongera (now Barakula) to transport railway sleepers made from logs taken from the state forest at Barakula and milled at the Barakula sawmill. The route of the Barakula tramway was based on an earlier plan to construct a railway line from Chinchilla to Taroom that was subsequently abandoned in favour of a railway line from Miles to Taroom. The tramway operated until 1970. It was a  gauge tramway.

Speculation Provisional School opened in 1908 and closed circa 1915.

Park View Provisional School opened circa 1910 and closed circa 1916.

The town was part of the Shire of Chinchilla local government entity from 1912, formed after splitting from the Shire of Wambo, until 2008 when it amalgamated with the Town of Dalby and the Shires of Murilla, Tara and Wambo and the southern part of Taroom to form the Western Downs Region.

Fairy Meadow Road State School opened on 5 November 1915 and closed in 1919.

Wilga Park Provisional School and Wombo Creek Provisional School both opened on 1916 as half-time schools (meaning they shared a single teacher). Wilga Park Provisional School closed in late 1917 or early 1918. It is not known if Wombo Creek Provisional School then also closed or operated on a full-time basis. From 9 July 1919 Wombo Creek Provisional School was operating on a half-time basis with the newly opened Gunbar Provisional School. Wombo Creek and Gunbar schools both closed circa 1925/6.

Logyard Provisional School opened in 1918, closing circa 1919. Logyard State School opened circa 1941 and closed in 1959.

Sixteen Mile Creek Provisional School opened on 5 February 1918 as a half-time provisional school (possibly in conjunction with Wombo Creek Provisional School). It closed on 1936.

The Chinchilla War Memorial was originally located near the railway overpass and was unveiled on 30 January 1919 by the Queensland Governor, Hamilton Goold-Adams. In 1977, it was substantially refurbished and relocated to the Returned and Services League of Australia club and was unveiled on 17 March 1979.

Gunbar Provisional School opened on 9 July 1919 as a half-time school in conjunction with Wombo Creek Provisional School. It closed circa 1925–1926. 

Colamba Provisional School opened on 14 October 1919. It closed in 1939.

Cambey Provisional School opened in 1922. It closed circa 1935.

Unity Provisional School opened on 16 November 1922. It closed in 1931. 

St Joseph's Catholic School was officially opened by Archbishop James Duhig on 27 January 1923, with the school commencing operation on 29 January 1923. It was established by three Sisters of St Joseph of the Sacred Heart with an initial enrolment of 63 students. Since 1992 the school has operated under lay leadership.

Oak Park State School opened on 13 February 1946. It closed in 1962.

Wambo Creek State School opened on 2 April 1946. It closed in 1961.

Chinchilla State High School opened on 29 January 1963, replacing the secondary department at Chinchilla State School.

Chinchilla Christian School opened 1 January 1983.  It was established by a group of local Christian parents. In 2014 it was renamed Chinchilla Christian College and in 2015 it joined the Christian Community Ministries network.

The Warwick Public Library opened in 1999 with a major refurbishment in 2012 and a minor refurbishment in 2016.

In the  the locality of Chinchilla had a population of 6,612 people:
 Aboriginal and Torres Strait Islander people made up 5.8% of the population. 
 80.2% of people were born in Australia. The next most common country of birth was New Zealand at 1.6%.
 84.5% of people spoke only English at home. 
 The most common responses for religion were Catholic 20.1%, Anglican 20.1% and No Religion 18.7%.

In 2018, Chinchilla won a national competition run by Wotif to create the Next Big Thing as a new tourist attraction.

Heritage listings 
Chinchilla has a number of heritage-listed sites, including:
 57 Heeney Street: Chinchilla Digger Statue
 First and second Chinchilla cemeteries
 Chinchilla Court House
 Chinchilla Hospital Complex
 Chinchilla Railway Complex
 Chinchilla War Memorials (including Anzac Park and Googs Memorial)
 Speculation Oil Well & Camp

Economy

Agriculture is the mainstay of the community, with beef and pork production, wool growing, and horticulture traditionally underwriting the local economy. However, with the recent resources boom, the Kogan Creek Power Station (and other coal and gas projects) have begun to inject welcome cash into the town and Chinchilla is experiencing mass growth and development. House prices in Chinchilla have boomed as a result of the need to house new workers.

The Western Downs Green Power Hub commenced construction in the Chinchilla region in July 2020. The project is located approx 20km south-east of Chinchilla in the Western Downs Region, in close proximity to a transmission line and less than 6kms from Queensland Powerlink's Western Downs Sub-station. Once operational, it is expected to be one of Australia's largest solar farms.

Education
Chinchilla State School is a government primary (Early Childhood-6) school for boys and girls at 34-40 Bell Street. In 2018, the school had an enrolment of 570 students with 50 teachers (43 full-time equivalent) and 29 non-teaching staff (20 full-time equivalent). It includes a special education program.

St Joseph's Catholic Primary School is a Catholic primary (Prep-6) school for boys and girls at 74 Middle Street. In 2018, the school had an enrolment of 235 students with 17 teachers (13 full-time equivalent) and 9 non-teaching staff (6 full-time equivalent).

Chinchilla Christian College is a private primary and secondary (Prep-12) school for boys and girls at 88 Oak Street. In 2018, the school had an enrolment of 261 students with 21 teachers (16 full-time equivalent) and 16 non-teaching staff (12 full-time equivalent).

Chinchilla State High School is a government secondary (7-12) school for boys and girls at 7 Tara Road. In 2014, the school had 524 students and 43 teachers (42 full-time equivalent). In 2018, the school had an enrolment of 654 students with 62 teachers (56 full-time equivalent) and 30 non-teaching staff (23 full-time equivalent). It includes a special education program.

The Southern Queensland Institute of TAFE annex is located in the high school grounds and works closely with local business and industries.

Leichhardt House is a hostel that provides accommodation for students from homes in remote areas.

Facilities 
Chinchilla has its own hospital, with an emergency ward, maternity ward and operating theatre. It can also care for long stay patients, and has other services such as social work, child health, physiotherapy, dietician, speech therapy, occupational therapy, mental health, community health services, a women's clinic and an x-ray facility.

In town, there is also a private dental practice, along with the public dental hospital. Five general practitioners operate in the area, along with an occupational therapist, optometrist, podiatrist, physiotherapists and chiropractors.

Amenities

Chinchilla has a Cultural Centre, which includes a 700-seat auditorium, cinema and function room, outdoor patio, theatrette, plus bar and kitchen facilities. Also included in the complex are the White Gums Art Gallery and the Library.

The Cultural Centre also houses a cinema showing recently released movies.

Chinchilla White Gums Art Gallery houses a new display every month.

The Western Downs Regional Council operates a public library in Chinchilla at 80-86 Heeney Street.

The Chinchilla branch of the Queensland Country Women's Association has its hall at 53 Heeney Street.

Chinchilla & District Uniting Church is at 31 Middle Street.

Trinity Lutheran Church is at 25 Sheriff Street.

Sport
Chinchilla has a range of sports facilities and a variety of sports clubs. Chinchilla Aquatic Centre houses an indoor 25m heated pool, an outdoor 50m pool and a gymnasium. The Chinchilla Family Sports Centre provides facilities for many sports and clubs. There are also clubs and facilities for soccer (Chinchilla Bears,) touch football, rugby league, cricket, tennis, squash, motocross, gymnastics, indoor netball, taekwondo, football and lawn bowls. A fishing club, Pony Club, and shooting range also operate in the area. In addition, there are Polocrosse grounds, a race track, and 9 hole golf course. A Multipurpose Sports Centre Stadium is currently being developed.

Media

Rebel FM 97.1 (formerly Sun FM) was Chinchilla's first commercial FM radio station. Rebel FM has a new rock & classic rock music format. Rebel FM's sister station, The Breeze broadcasts on 95.5 FM with an easy adult contemporary & classic hits format. Both stations are part of the Gold Coast-based Rebel Media Group which operates a radio network that reaches the Gold Coast and South Brisbane to many centres throughout regional and outback Queensland.

Chinchilla News and Murilla Advertiser is the local newspaper. The publication transitioned to digital only in June 2020 prior to that it was published every Thursday.

Attractions
Chinchilla is one of the towns located on the Warrego Highway, which is a main highway leading out west to Charleville, and a popular tourist route. The mainstays of Chinchilla's tourism industry are the Historical Museum, fishing and fossicking for petrified wood. 'Chinchilla Red' petrified wood is unique to the area, and known for its colour and quality. The Chinchilla White Gum (Eucalyptus argophloia) is also unique to the area, and can be seen on some of the tourist drives which are marked around the region.

An accredited Visitor Information Center is located on the Highway.

Events 

The Chinchilla Grandfather Clock Campdraft is a major event held every October, where entrants compete for the Grandfather Clock prize. Chinchilla also hosts horse races four times a year.

Chinchilla Melon Festival 
As Chinchilla produces 25% of Australia's melons (including watermelon, rockmelon and honeydew), the first Chinchilla Melon Festival  was held in 1994 by local producers and businessmen, to lift the town's spirits after the severe drought experienced in the early 1990s. Estimated numbers at the first Festival were approximately 2,500 which grew to an estimate that there were 10,000 visitors on the main day of the 2011 festival.

In 2009, the Melon Festival won the Queensland Regional Achievement and Community Award for Tourism Event.

The Festival features interactive and unique events, such as Melon Skiing, Melon Bungee, Melon Bullseye, Melon Ironman, Melon Chariot, a pip spitting competition, and melon eating races. A special event held in 2009 saw John Allwood secure the Guinness World Record of Melon Head Smashing - cracking open as many watermelons as possible using only the head. Currently his record is 47 melons in a minute.

Transport
Chinchilla is connected to Brisbane, Toowoomba and Roma by the Warrego Highway.

Greyhound Australia operates bus services daily between Brisbane and Miles via Chinchilla. Bus Queensland operates 2-3 daily bus services between Brisbane and Mount Isa via Longreach and Charleville, and three buses a week between Toowoomba and Rockhampton, along the Dawson Highway. Murrays Coaches also operates a daily service to and from Brisbane.

The Westlander train also comes through Chinchilla twice a week, on its way between Brisbane and Charleville.

As it is a small town, there is no public transport (besides a taxi), although many coal and gas companies run contracted buses out to their sites.

Notable locals

John Gleeson, rugby league player, went on to captain Queensland and play for the Australia national rugby league team in the 1960s.
David Littleproud, Leader of the National Party (2022–present)
 George Miller, film producer
 Pete Murray, Australian folk/country singer, grew up in Chinchilla.
Dean Ray, singer/performer
Nathan Reardon, cricketer
Gerard Rennick, Senator for Queensland
Ben Ross, rugby league player

References

External links

 
 

 
Towns in Queensland
Towns in the Darling Downs
Populated places established in 1877
1877 establishments in Australia
Western Downs Region
Localities in Queensland